Chowdhury Tanbir Ahmed Siddiky (also spelled Chowdhury Tanvir Ahmed Siddiky) is a Bangladeshi politician. He is one of the founding members of the Bangladesh Nationalist Party (BNP). He served as the State Minister for Commerce in the cabinet of President Ziaur Rahman and President Abdus Sattar. He served as the senior-most member of the Bangladesh Nationalist Party's (BNP) highest decision making body, the National Standing Committee, until he was expelled from the party in March 2009, which was withdrawn in November 2018 and he was reinstated in his previous party position. He had previously served as the president of FBCCI, the body that regulates businessmen in Bangladesh, in 1979 and DCCI in '76–'78.

Early life
Siddiky was born in 1939. He is the grandson of Khan Bahadur Chowdhury Kazemuddin Ahmed Siddiky, the co-founder of the Assam-Bengal Muslim League during the British rule and one of the founders of the University of Dhaka.

Career
Siddiky is the founder treasurer of the BNP and was a member of the National Standing Committee since its inception. He was a member of the second parliament and served as the Commerce minister in 1979–81. Siddiky was the president of FBCCI in 1979 and DCCI in '76–'78 and worked as director of former National Bank of Pakistan and Janata Bank. During the term of Military dictator Hussain Muhammad Ershad, Tanbir Siddiky was convicted of corruption by the martial law court and served 3 years of a 14-year sentence before being released during the Anti-Ershad Movement. In March 2009, he was expelled from the BNP for violating party discipline. Tanbir Siddiky had been present at a press conference where his son made allegations against the BNP Chairperson Begum Zia and other politicians. His son Chowdhury Irad Ahmed Siddiky was a candidate for the Mayor of Dhaka North in 2015.  Tanbir Siddiky did not speak out against his son's actions until the next day. Tanbir Siddiky has stated that the expulsion was contrary to the party's constitution. He was reinstated in his previous party position in November 2018 and participated in the 2018 National Elections as the Bangladesh Nationalist Party's candidate from Gazipur-1.

References

Former parliament members from Dhaka-18
Bangladesh Nationalist Party politicians
Living people
State Ministers of Commerce (Bangladesh)
1939 births
Notre Dame College, Dhaka alumni
6th Jatiya Sangsad members
20th-century Bengalis
21st-century Bengalis
Bangladeshi people of Turkic descent